This page lists all described species of the spider family Oxyopidae accepted by the World Spider Catalog :

Hamadruas

Hamadruas Deeleman-Reinhold, 2009
 H. austera (Thorell, 1894) — Singapore
 H. heterosticta (Pocock, 1897) — Indonesia (Sulawesi, Moluccas)
 H. hieroglyphica (Thorell, 1887) (type) — China, Myanmar
 H. insulana (Thorell, 1891) — India (Nicobar Is.)
 H. pupulus (Thorell, 1890) — Indonesia (Nias Is.)
 H. severa (Thorell, 1895) — Myanmar, Indonesia (Lombok)
 H. signifera (Doleschall, 1859) — Indonesia (Java)
 H. sikkimensis (Tikader, 1970) — India, Bangladesh, China
 H. superba (Thorell, 1887) — Myanmar, Thailand, Indonesia (Borneo)

Hamataliwa

Hamataliwa Keyserling, 1887
 H. albibarbis (Mello-Leitão, 1947) — Brazil
 H. argyrescens Mello-Leitão, 1929 — Brazil
 H. aurita Zhang, Zhu & Song, 2005 — China
 H. banksi (Mello-Leitão, 1928) — Mexico to Costa Rica
 H. barroana (Chamberlin & Ivie, 1936) — Mexico to Panama
 H. bicolor (Mello-Leitão, 1929) — Brazil
 H. bituberculata (Mello-Leitão, 1929) — Brazil, Guyana
 H. brunnea (F. O. Pickard-Cambridge, 1902) — Mexico
 H. buelowae Mello-Leitão, 1945 — Argentina
 H. bufo Brady, 1970 — Panama
 H. catenula Deeleman-Reinhold, 2009 — Malaysia, Indonesia (Borneo, Sunda Is.)
 H. caudata Mello-Leitão, 1929 — Brazil
 H. cavata (Kraus, 1955) — El Salvador
 H. cheta Brady, 1970 — Guatemala
 H. circularis (Kraus, 1955) — El Salvador
 H. communicans (Chamberlin, 1925) — Hispaniola
 H. cooki Grimshaw, 1989 — Australia (Northern Territory, Queensland)
 H. cordata Zhang, Zhu & Song, 2005 — China
 H. cornuta (Thorell, 1895) — Myanmar
 H. crocata Brady, 1970 — Panama
 H. cucullata Tang, Wang & Peng, 2012 — China
 H. difficilis (O. Pickard-Cambridge, 1894) — Mexico
 H. dimidiata (Soares & Camargo, 1948) — Brazil
 H. dubia (Mello-Leitão, 1929) — Brazil
 H. facilis (O. Pickard-Cambridge, 1894) — Mexico, Guatemala
 H. flebilis (O. Pickard-Cambridge, 1894) — Mexico to Panama
 H. floreni Deeleman-Reinhold, 2009 — Malaysia, Indonesia (Borneo)
 H. foveata Tang & Li, 2012 — China
 H. fronticornis (Lessert, 1927) — DR Congo, South Africa
 H. fronto (Thorell, 1890) — Indonesia (Sumatra)
 H. globosa (F. O. Pickard-Cambridge, 1902) — Mexico to Panama
 H. grisea Keyserling, 1887 (type) — USA, Mexico
 H. haytiana (Chamberlin, 1925) — Hispaniola
 H. helia (Chamberlin, 1929) — USA, Mexico, Guyana, Thailand, Malaysia (Sarawak), Brunei, Indonesia (Sumatra)
 H. hellia Dhali, Saha & Raychaudhuri, 2017 — India
 H. hista Brady, 1970 — Panama
 H. ignifuga Deeleman-Reinhold, 2009 — Borneo
 H. incompta (Thorell, 1895) — India, Myanmar, Thailand, Malaysia, Philippines, Indonesia (Borneo)
 H. kulczynskii (Lessert, 1915) — Ethiopia, Botswana, Eswatini, South Africa
 H. labialis (Song, 1991) — China
 H. laeta (O. Pickard-Cambridge, 1894) — Mexico
 H. latifrons (Thorell, 1890) — Indonesia (Sumatra)
 H. maculipes (Bryant, 1923) — Antigua and Barbuda (Antigua)
 H. manca Tang & Li, 2012 — China
 H. marmorata Simon, 1898 — Brazil, Paraguay
 H. menglunensis Tang & Li, 2012 — China
 H. micropunctata (Mello-Leitão, 1929) — Brazil
 H. monroei Grimshaw, 1989 — Australia (Queensland)
 H. nigrescens Mello-Leitão, 1929 — Brazil
 H. nigritarsa Bryant, 1948 — Hispaniola
 H. nigriventris (Mello-Leitão, 1929) — Brazil
 H. obtusa (Thorell, 1892) — Indonesia (Sumatra)
 H. oculata Tang & Li, 2012 — China
 H. ovata (Biswas, Kundu, Kundu, Saha & Raychaudhuri, 1996) — India
 H. pedicula Tang & Li, 2012 — China
 H. penicillata Mello-Leitão, 1948 — Guyana
 H. pentagona Tang & Li, 2012 — India, China
 H. perdita Mello-Leitão, 1929 — Brazil
 H. peterjaegeri Deeleman-Reinhold, 2009 — Borneo
 H. pilulifera Tang & Li, 2012 — China
 H. porcata (Simon, 1898) — Brazil
 H. positiva Chamberlin, 1924 — Mexico
 H. pricompta Deeleman-Reinhold, 2009 — Borneo, Sumatra
 H. puta (O. Pickard-Cambridge, 1894) — Mexico to Panama
 H. quadrimaculata (Mello-Leitão, 1929) — Brazil
 H. rana (Simon, 1898) — Caribbean
 H. reticulata (Biswas, Kundu, Kundu, Saha & Raychaudhuri, 1996) — India
 H. rostrifrons (Lawrence, 1928) — Namibia, South Africa
 H. rufocaligata Simon, 1898 — Ethiopia, Djibouti, Somalia, Botswana, South Africa
 H. sanmenensis Song & Zheng, 1992 — China
 H. schmidti Reimoser, 1939 — Mexico to Costa Rica
 H. strandi (Lessert, 1923) — Mozambique, South Africa
 H. subfacilis (O. Pickard-Cambridge, 1894) — Mexico
 H. subhadrae (Tikader, 1970) — China, India
 H. submanca Tang & Li, 2012 — China
 H. torsiva Tang, Wang & Peng, 2012 — China
 H. triangularis (Kraus, 1955) — El Salvador, Panama
 H. tricuspidata (F. O. Pickard-Cambridge, 1902) — Costa Rica to Guyana
 H. truncata (Thorell, 1897) — Vietnam
 H. tuberculata (Chamberlin, 1925) — Cuba
 H. unca Brady, 1964 — USA
 H. ursa Brady, 1970 — Panama
 H. vanbruggeni Deeleman-Reinhold, 2009 — Borneo

Hostus

Hostus Simon, 1898
 H. paroculus Simon, 1898 (type) — Madagascar

Oxyopes

Oxyopes Latreille, 1804
 O. acleistus Chamberlin, 1929 — USA, Mexico
 O. aculeatus Bösenberg & Lenz, 1895 — East Africa
 O. affinis Lessert, 1915 — DR Congo, Tanzania, Mozambique, South Africa
 O. aglossus Chamberlin, 1929 — USA
 O. albertianus Strand, 1913 — Congo, Uganda
 O. algerianus (Walckenaer, 1841) — Morocco, Algeria
 O. allectus Simon, 1909 — Gabon, Guinea-Bissau
 O. altifrons Mello-Leitão, 1941 — Brazil
 O. amoenus L. Koch, 1878 — Australia (Queensland, New South Wales, South Australia?, Northern Territory?)
 O. angulitarsus Lessert, 1915 — Uganda, South Africa
 O. annularis Yin, Zhang & Bao, 2003 — China
 O. annulipes Thorell, 1890 — Indonesia (Sumatra)
 O. apollo Brady, 1964 — USA, Mexico
 O. arcuatus Yin, Zhang & Bao, 2003 — China
 O. argentosus Simon, 1909 — Guinea-Bissau
 O. argyrotrichius Mello-Leitão, 1929 — Brazil
 O. armatipalpis Strand, 1912 — India
 O. artemis Brady, 1969 — USA
 O. arushae Caporiacco, 1947 — East Africa
 O. ashae Gajbe, 1999 — India
 O. aspirasi Barrion & Litsinger, 1995 — Philippines
 O. assamensis Tikader, 1969 — India
 O. asterion Simon, 1909 — Guinea-Bissau
 O. attenuatus L. Koch, 1878 — Australia (Queensland)
 O. auratus Thorell, 1890 — Singapore, Indonesia (Sumatra)
 O. aureolus Thorell, 1899 — Cameroon
 O. auriculatus Lawrence, 1927 — Namibia
 O. azhari Butt & Beg, 2001 — Pakistan
 O. baccatus Simon, 1897 — Ethiopia
 O. badhyzicus Mikhailov & Fet, 1986 — Israel, Iran, Turkmenistan
 O. balteiformis Yin, Zhang & Bao, 2003 — China
 O. bantaengi Merian, 1911 — Indonesia (Sulawesi)
 O. bedoti Lessert, 1915 — East Africa, South Africa
 O. berlandorum Lessert, 1915 — East Africa
 O. bharatae Gajbe, 1999 — India
 O. bicorneus Zhang & Zhu, 2005 — China
 O. bidentata Mukhtar, 2017 — Pakistan
 O. bifidus F. O. Pickard-Cambridge, 1902 — Mexico to Panama
 O. bifissus F. O. Pickard-Cambridge, 1902 — Mexico to Costa Rica
 O. biharensis Gajbe, 1999 — India
 O. birabeni Mello-Leitão, 1941 — Argentina
 O. birmanicus Thorell, 1887 — India, China to Indonesia (Sumatra)
 O. bolivianus Tullgren, 1905 — Bolivia
 O. bonneti Lessert, 1933 — Angola, South Africa
 O. boriensis Bodkhe & Vankhede, 2012 — India
 O. bothai Lessert, 1915 — Ethiopia, Tanzania, South Africa
 O. bouvieri Berland, 1922 — Ethiopia
 O. brachiatus Simon, 1909 — Equatorial Guinea (Bioko), Congo
 O. brevis Thorell, 1881 — Indonesia (Aru Is.)
 O. caboverdensis Schmidt & Krause, 1994 — Cape Verde Is.
 O. calcaratus Schenkel, 1944 — Timor
 O. campestratus Simon, 1909 — Guinea-Bissau, Equatorial Guinea (Bioko), São Tomé and Príncipe
 O. campii Mushtaq & Qadar, 1999 — Pakistan
 O. camponis Strand, 1915 — Cameroon
 O. candidoi Garcia-Neto, 1995 — Brazil
 O. caporiaccoi Roewer, 1951 — Ethiopia
 O. carvalhoi Mello-Leitão, 1947 — Brazil
 O. castaneus Lawrence, 1927 — Namibia, South Africa
 O. ceylonicus Karsch, 1892 — Sri Lanka
 O. chapini Lessert, 1927 — DR Congo, Namibia, South Africa
 O. chenabensis Mukhtar, 2017 — Pakistan
 O. chiapas Brady, 1975 — Mexico
 O. chittrae Tikader, 1965 — India
 O. coccineoventris Lessert, 1946 — Congo
 O. cochinchinensis (Walckenaer, 1837) — Vietnam
 O. complicatus Tang & Li, 2012 — China
 O. concolor Simon, 1877 — Philippines
 O. concoloratus Roewer, 1951 — Ethiopia
 O. constrictus Keyserling, 1891 — Brazil, Guyana
 O. cornifrons (Thorell, 1899) — Cameroon, Guinea-Bissau
 O. c. avakubensis Lessert, 1927 — Cameroon, Guinea-Bissau, DR Congo, South Africa
 O. cornutus F. O. Pickard-Cambridge, 1902 — Mexico
 O. cougar Brady, 1969 — USA
 O. crassus Schmidt & Krause, 1995 — Cape Verde Is.
 O. crewi Bryant, 1948 — Bahamas, Cuba, Jamaica, Hispaniola, St. Kitts and Nevis
 O. daksina Sherriffs, 1955 — Sri Lanka, China
 O. decorosus Zhang & Zhu, 2005 — China
 O. delesserti Caporiacco, 1947 — Ethiopia, East Africa
 O. delmonteensis Barrion & Litsinger, 1995 — Philippines
 O. dingo Strand, 1913 — Central Australia
 O. dubourgi Simon, 1904 — Sudan, Congo
 O. dumonti (Vinson, 1863) — Ethiopia, Zimbabwe, South Africa, Seychelles, Madagascar, Réunion, Mauritius
 O. elegans L. Koch, 1878 — Australia (New South Wales, Northern Territory?, Queensland?, Victoria?)
 O. elifaz Levy, 2007 — Israel, Jordan
 O. elongatus Biswas, Kundu, Kundu, Saha & Raychaudhuri, 1996 — India
 O. extensipes (Butler, 1876) — Mauritius (Rodriguez)
 O. fabae Dhali, Saha & Raychaudhuri, 2015 — India
 O. falcatus Zhang, Yang & Zhu, 2005 — China
 O. falconeri Lessert, 1915 — Tanzania, Namibia, Botswana, Zimbabwe, South Africa
 O. fallax Denis, 1955 — Niger
 O. felinus Brady, 1964 — USA, Mexico
 O. flavipalpis (Lucas, 1858) — Ethiopia, Somalia, Cameroon, DR Congo, Guinea, Tanzania, Zimbabwe, South Africa, Eswatini
 O. flavus Banks, 1898 — Mexico to Costa Rica
 O. fluminensis Mello-Leitão, 1929 — Brazil
 O. forcipiformis Xie & Kim, 1996 — China
 O. fujianicus Song & Zhu, 1993 — China, Taiwan
 O. galla Caporiacco, 1941 — Ethiopia, Namibia, South Africa
 O. gaofengensis Zhang, Zhang & Kim, 2005 — China
 O. gemellus Thorell, 1891 — India (Nicobar Is.), Malaysia
 O. globifer Simon, 1876 — Mediterranean to Central Asia
 O. godeffroyi Baehr, Harms, Dupérré & Raven, 2017 — Australia (Queensland)
 O. gorumaraensis Sen, Saha & Raychaudhuri, 2011 — India
 O. gossypae Mushtaq & Qadar, 1999 — Pakistan
 O. gracilipes (White, 1849) — Australia (New South Wales, Queensland), New Zealand
 O. gratus L. Koch, 1878 — Australia (Queensland, ?Victoria, ?Northern Territory,?Western Australia)
 O. gujaratensis Gajbe, 1999 — India
 O. gurjanti Sadana & Gupta, 1995 — India
 O. gyirongensis Hu & Li, 1987 — China
 O. haryanaensis Goyal & Malik, 2020 — India
 O. hasta Lo, Cheng & Lin, 2021 — Taiwan
 O. hastifer Simon, 1909 — Guinea-Bissau
 O. hemorrhous Mello-Leitão, 1929 — Brazil
 O. heterophthalmus (Latreille, 1804) (type) — Europe, North Africa to Middle East, Turkey, Caucasus, Kazakhstan, China
 O. hilaris Thorell, 1881 — Timor
 O. hindostanicus Pocock, 1901 — Pakistan, India, Sri Lanka
 O. hoggi Lessert, 1915 — Tanzania, Angola, Zimbabwe, South Africa
 O. holmbergi Soares & Camargo, 1948 — Brazil
 O. hotingchiehi Schenkel, 1963 — China, India
 O. hupingensis Bao & Yin, 2002 — China
 O. idoneus Simon, 1909 — Guinea-Bissau
 O. imbellis Thorell, 1890 — Malaysia
 O. incantatus Santos, 2017 — Ecuador (Galapagos)
 O. incertus Mello-Leitão, 1929 — Peru, Brazil
 O. indiculus Thorell, 1897 — Myanmar
 O. indicus (Walckenaer, 1805) — India
 O. inversus Mello-Leitão, 1949 — Brazil
 O. iranicus Esyunin, Rad & Kamoneh, 2011 — Iran
 O. isangipinus Barrion, Barrion-Dupo & Heong, 2013 — China (Hainan)
 O. jabalpurensis Gajbe & Gajbe, 1999 — India
 O. jacksoni Lessert, 1915 — Tanzania, Malawi, Botswana, Zimbabwe, South Africa
 O. javanus Thorell, 1887 — India, Bangladesh, Indonesia (Java), Philippines, China
 O. jianfeng Song, 1991 — China
 O. jubilans O. Pickard-Cambridge, 1885 — Karakorum, Pakistan, China
 O. kamalae Gajbe, 1999 — India
 O. ketani Gajbe & Gajbe, 1999 — India
 O. keyserlingi Thorell, 1881 — New Guinea
 O. kobrooricus Strand, 1911 — Indonesia (Aru Is.)
 O. kochi Thorell, 1897 — Myanmar
 O. kohaensis Bodkhe & Vankhede, 2012 — India
 O. koreanus Paik, 1969 — Korea, Japan
 O. kovacsi Caporiacco, 1947 — Ethiopia
 O. kraepelinorum Bösenberg, 1895 — Canary Is.
 O. kumarae Biswas & Roy, 2005 — India
 O. kusumae Gajbe, 1999 — India
 O. lagarus Thorell, 1895 — Myanmar
 O. lepidus (Blackwall, 1864) — India
 O. licenti Schenkel, 1953 — Russia (Middle Siberia to Far East), China, Korea, Japan
 O. linearis Sen, Dhali, Saha & Raychaudhuri, 2015 — India
 O. lineatipes (C. L. Koch, 1847) — China to Philippines, Indonesia (Sumatra, Java)
 O. lineatus Latreille, 1806 — Europe, Turkey, Caucasus, Russia (Europe to Central Asia), Middle East, Central Asia
 O. l. occidentalis Kulczyński, 1907 — Italy
 O. longespina Caporiacco, 1940 — Ethiopia
 O. longetibiatus Caporiacco, 1941 — Ethiopia
 O. longinquus Thorell, 1891 — Myanmar, India (Nicobar Is.)
 O. longipalpis Lessert, 1946 — Congo
 O. longispinosus Lawrence, 1938 — Tanzania, Botswana, South Africa
 O. longispinus Saha & Raychaudhuri, 2003 — India
 O. ludhianaensis Sadana & Goel, 1995 — India
 O. lynx Brady, 1964 — USA
 O. machuensis Mukhtar, 2013 — Pakistan
 O. macilentus L. Koch, 1878 — Japan, China to Australia
 O. macroscelides Mello-Leitão, 1929 — Brazil, Paraguay
 O. maripae Caporiacco, 1954 — French Guiana
 O. masculinus Caporiacco, 1954 — French Guiana
 O. mathias Strand, 1913 — Uganda
 O. matiensis Barrion & Litsinger, 1995 — Philippines
 O. mediterraneus Levy, 1999 — Portugal, Spain, Greece, Cyprus, Israel, Iran
 O. megalops Caporiacco, 1947 — East Africa
 O. minutus Biswas, Kundu, Kundu, Saha & Raychaudhuri, 1996 — India
 O. mirabilis Zhang, Yang & Zhu, 2005 — China
 O. modestus Simon, 1876 — Congo
 O. molarius L. Koch, 1878 — Australia (Queensland, South Australia?, New South Wales?)
 O. mundulus L. Koch, 1878 — Australia (New South Wales, Tasmania?)
 O. naliniae Gajbe, 1999 — India
 O. nanulineatus Levy, 1999 — Israel
 O. nenilini Esyunin & Tuneva, 2009 — Uzbekistan, China
 O. nigripalpis Kulczyński, 1891 — Mediterranean
 O. nilgiricus Sherriffs, 1955 — India, Sri Lanka
 O. ningxiaensis Tang & Song, 1990 — China
 O. niveosigillatus Mello-Leitão, 1945 — Argentina
 O. obscurifrons Simon, 1909 — São Tomé and Príncipe
 O. occidens Brady, 1964 — USA, Mexico
 O. ocelot Brady, 1975 — Mexico
 O. ornatus (Blackwall, 1868) — Tropical Africa
 O. oryzae Mushtaq & Qadar, 1999 — Pakistan
 O. pallidecoloratus Strand, 1906 — Ethiopia, Congo, Southern Africa, Madagascar
 O. p. nigricans Caporiacco, 1947 — East Africa
 O. pallidus (C. L. Koch, 1838) — Caribbean
 O. palliventer Strand, 1911 — Indonesia (Aru Is.)
 O. pandae Tikader, 1969 — India, Bangladesh
 O. pankaji Gajbe & Gajbe, 2000 — India
 O. panther Brady, 1975 — USA, Mexico
 O. papuanus Thorell, 1881 — New Guinea, Solomon Is., Australia (Queensland)
 O. pardus Brady, 1964 — USA
 O. patalongensis Simon, 1901 — Malaysia
 O. pawani Gajbe, 1992 — India
 O. pennatus Schenkel, 1936 — China
 O. personatus Simon, 1896 — South Africa
 O. pigmentatus Simon, 1890 — Israel, Yemen
 O. pingasus Barrion & Litsinger, 1995 — Philippines
 O. positivus Roewer, 1961 — Senegal
 O. praedictus O. Pickard-Cambridge, 1885 — China (Yarkand)
 O. providens Thorell, 1890 — Indonesia (Sumatra)
 O. pugilator Mello-Leitão, 1929 — Brazil
 O. pulchellus (Lucas, 1858) — Congo
 O. punctatus L. Koch, 1878 — Australia (Queensland)
 O. purpurissatus Simon, 1909 — Congo
 O. quadridentatus Thorell, 1895 — Myanmar
 O. quadrifasciatus L. Koch, 1878 — Australia (Queensland)
 O. rajai Saha & Raychaudhuri, 2003 — India
 O. ramosus (Martini & Goeze, 1778) — Europe, Turkey, Caucasus, Russia (Europe to South Siberia), Kazakhstan, Korea
 O. ratnae Tikader, 1970 — Pakistan, India, Bangladesh
 O. raviensis Dyal, 1935 — Pakistan
 O. reddyi Majumder, 2004 — India
 O. reimoseri Caporiacco, 1947 — East Africa
 O. rejectus O. Pickard-Cambridge, 1885 — China (Yarkand)
 O. rouxi Strand, 1911 — Indonesia (Aru Is.)
 O. royi Roewer, 1961 — Senegal
 O. rubicundus L. Koch, 1878 — Australia (New South Wales)
 O. rubriventer Caporiacco, 1941 — East Africa
 O. r. paecilus Caporiacco, 1941 — Ethiopia
 O. rubrosignatus Keyserling, 1891 — Brazil
 O. rufisternis Pocock, 1901 — Pakistan, India, Sri Lanka
 O. rufovittatus Simon, 1886 — Senegal
 O. rukminiae Gajbe, 1999 — India
 O. russoi Caporiacco, 1940 — Somalia, South Africa, Eswatini
 O. russulus Thorell, 1895 — Myanmar
 O. rutilius Simon, 1890 — Yemen (mainland, Socotra)
 O. ruwenzoricus Strand, 1913 — Uganda
 O. ryvesi Pocock, 1901 — India, Pakistan
 O. saganus Bösenberg & Strand, 1906 — Japan
 O. sakuntalae Tikader, 1970 — India
 O. salticus Hentz, 1845 — USA to northern Argentina and Chile
 O. saradae Biswas & Roy, 2005 — India
 O. sataricus Kulkarni & Deshpande, 2012 — India
 O. scalaris Hentz, 1845 — North America
 O. schenkeli Lessert, 1927 — DR Congo, Uganda, Botswana, Zimbabwe, South Africa
 O. sectus Mello-Leitão, 1929 — Brazil
 O. septumatus Mukhtar, 2013 — Pakistan
 O. sertatoides Xie & Kim, 1996 — China
 O. sertatus L. Koch, 1878 — India, China, Taiwan, Korea, Japan
 O. setipes Thorell, 1890 — Borneo
 O. sexmaculatus Mello-Leitão, 1929 — Peru, Brazil
 O. shakilae Mukhtar, 2013 — Pakistan
 O. shorkotensis Mukhtar, 2013 — Pakistan
 O. shweta Tikader, 1970 — Pakistan, India, China
 O. sinaiticus Levy, 1999 — Egypt
 O. singularis Lessert, 1927 — DR Congo, Namibia, Zimbabwe, South Africa
 O. sitae Tikader, 1970 — India (mainland, Andaman Is.), Bangladesh
 O. sjostedti Lessert, 1915 — Ethiopia, Tanzania, South Africa
 O. sobrinus O. Pickard-Cambridge, 1872 — Libya, Cyprus, Israel, United Arab Emirates, Iran
 O. squamosus Simon, 1886 — Senegal
 O. stephanurus Mello-Leitão, 1929 — Brazil
 O. strandi Caporiacco, 1939 — Ethiopia
 O. striagatus Song, 1991 — China, Taiwan
 O. striatus (Doleschall, 1857) — Myanmar to New Guinea
 O. subabebae Caporiacco, 1941 — Ethiopia, South Africa
 O. subimali Biswas, Kundu, Kundu, Saha & Raychaudhuri, 1996 — India
 O. submirabilis Tang & Li, 2012 — China
 O. summus Brady, 1975 — Costa Rica, Panama
 O. sunandae Tikader, 1970 — India, Bangladesh
 O. sushilae Tikader, 1965 — India, China, Taiwan
 O. taeniatulus Roewer, 1955 — Brazil
 O. taeniatus Thorell, 1877 — Indonesia (Sumatra, Java, Sulawesi)
 O. taiwanensis Lo, Cheng & Lin, 2021 — Taiwan
 O. takobius Andreeva & Tystshenko, 1969 — Central Asia to China
 O. tapponiformis Strand, 1911 — Indonesia (Moluccas), New Guinea
 O. tenellus Song, 1991 — China
 O. tibialis F. O. Pickard-Cambridge, 1902 — Mexico, Guatemala, El Salvador, Nicaragua
 O. tiengianensis Barrion & Litsinger, 1995 — Vietnam
 O. tikaderi Biswas & Majumder, 1995 — India
 O. timorensis Schenkel, 1944 — Timor
 O. timorianus (Walckenaer, 1837) — Timor
 O. toschii Caporiacco, 1949 — Kenya
 O. travancoricola Strand, 1912 — India
 O. tridens Brady, 1964 — USA, Mexico
 O. tuberculatus Lessert, 1915 — Tanzania, South Africa, Eswatini
 O. t. mombensis Lessert, 1915 — East Africa
 O. ubensis Strand, 1906 — Ethiopia
 O. uncinatus Lessert, 1915 — Tanzania, South Africa
 O. vanderysti Lessert, 1946 — DR Congo, South Africa
 O. variabilis L. Koch, 1878 — Australia (Queensland, Western Australia?, South Australia?, New South Wales?)
 O. versicolor Thorell, 1887 — Myanmar
 O. vogelsangeri Lessert, 1946 — DR Congo, South Africa
 O. wokamanus Strand, 1911 — Indonesia (Aru Is.)
 O. wroughtoni Pocock, 1901 — Pakistan, India
 O. xinjiangensis Hu & Wu, 1989 — Kazakhstan, China
 O. zavattarii Caporiacco, 1939 — Ethiopia
 † O. defectus Wunderlich, 1988 
 † O. succini Petrunkevitch, 1958

Peucetia

Peucetia Thorell, 1869
 P. akwadaensis Patel, 1978 — India, China
 P. albescens L. Koch, 1878 — Australia (Queensland)
 P. ananthakrishnani Murugesan, Mathew, Sudhikumar, Sunish, Biju & Sebastian, 2006 — India
 P. arabica Simon, 1882 — Greece, North, East Africa, Middle East
 P. ashae Gajbe & Gajbe, 1999 — India
 P. betlaensis Saha & Raychaudhuri, 2007 — India
 P. biharensis Gajbe, 1999 — India
 P. casseli Simon, 1900 — West, Central Africa
 P. cayapa Santos & Brescovit, 2003 — Ecuador, Peru
 P. choprai Tikader, 1965 — India
 P. crucifera Lawrence, 1927 — Namibia, Botswana, Zimbabwe, South Africa
 P. elegans (Blackwall, 1864) — India
 P. flava Keyserling, 1877 — Venezuela to Argentina
 P. formosensis Kishida, 1930 — Taiwan
 P. gauntleta Saha & Raychaudhuri, 2004 — India
 P. gerhardi van Niekerk & Dippenaar-Schoeman, 1994 — West, Central, East Africa
 P. graminea Pocock, 1900 — India
 P. harishankarensis Biswas, 1975 — India
 P. jabalpurensis Gajbe & Gajbe, 1999 — India
 P. ketani Gajbe, 1992 — India
 P. latikae Tikader, 1970 — India, China
 P. lesserti van Niekerk & Dippenaar-Schoeman, 1994 — Niger, Kenya
 P. longipalpis F. O. Pickard-Cambridge, 1902 — USA to Venezuela
 P. lucasi (Vinson, 1863) — Botswana, South Africa, Comoros, Mayotte, Madagascar
 P. macroglossa Mello-Leitão, 1929 — Colombia, Brazil, Guyana
 P. maculifera Pocock, 1900 — South Africa, Lesotho
 P. madagascariensis (Vinson, 1863) — Comoros, Mayotte, Madagascar
 P. madalenae van Niekerk & Dippenaar-Schoeman, 1994 — Mozambique, South Africa
 P. margaritata Hogg, 1914 — Australia (Montebello Is.)
 P. myanmarensis Barrion & Litsinger, 1995 — Myanmar
 P. nicolae van Niekerk & Dippenaar-Schoeman, 1994 — South Africa
 P. pawani Gajbe, 1999 — India
 P. phantasma Ahmed, Satam, Khalap & Mohan, 2015 — India
 P. procera Thorell, 1887 — Myanmar
 P. pulchra (Blackwall, 1865) — Central, Eastern, Southern Africa, Seychelles
 P. punjabensis Gajbe, 1999 — India
 P. rajani Gajbe, 1999 — India
 P. ranganathani Biswas & Roy, 2005 — India
 P. rubrolineata Keyserling, 1877 — Panama to Argentina
 P. striata Karsch, 1878 — Yemen to South Africa, Comoros. Introduced to St. Helena
 P. transvaalica Simon, 1896 — Central, Southern Africa
 P. virescens (O. Pickard-Cambridge, 1872) — Turkey, Middle East
 P. viridana (Stoliczka, 1869) — Pakistan, India, Sri Lanka, Bangladesh, Myanmar
 P. viridans (Hentz, 1832) — North & Central America, Caribbean, Venezuela
 P. viridis (Blackwall, 1858) (type) — Spain, Greece, Africa, Middle East. Introduced to Caribbean Is.
 P. viveki Gajbe, 1999 — India
 P. yogeshi Gajbe, 1999 — India

† Planoxyopes

† Planoxyopes Petrunkevitch, 1963
 † P. eximius Petrunkevitch, 1963

Pseudohostus

Pseudohostus Rainbow, 1915
 P. squamosus Rainbow, 1915 (type) — Australia (South Australia)

Schaenicoscelis

Schaenicoscelis Simon, 1898
 S. concolor Simon, 1898 — Brazil
 S. elegans Simon, 1898 (type) — Brazil
 S. exilis Mello-Leitão, 1930 — Brazil
 S. guianensis Caporiacco, 1947 — Guyana
 S. leucochlora Mello-Leitão, 1929 — Brazil
 S. luteola Mello-Leitão, 1929 — Brazil
 S. viridis Mello-Leitão, 1927 — Brazil

Tapinillus

Tapinillus Simon, 1898
 T. longipes (Taczanowski, 1872) (type) — Costa Rica, Panama, Colombia, Venezuela, French Guiana, Trinidad & Tobago, Peru, Brazil, Argentina
 T. purpuratus Mello-Leitão, 1940 — Brazil
 T. roseisterni Mello-Leitão, 1930 — Brazil

Tapponia

Tapponia Simon, 1885
 T. micans Simon, 1885 (type) — Malaysia, Indonesia (Sumatra, Borneo)

References

Oxyopidae